The 1930 Pennsylvania gubernatorial election occurred on November 4, 1930. Incumbent Republican  governor John Stuchell Fisher was not a candidate for re-election. Republican candidate and former governor Gifford Pinchot defeated Democratic candidate John M. Hemphill to win a second, non-consecutive term as Governor of Pennsylvania.

This was the only election from 1863 until 1950 in which the Democratic candidate carried the city and county of Philadelphia, which was controlled by a powerful Republican political machine during that time. Hemphill won the city in a landslide with the support of Philadelphia Republican boss William Scott Vare, who abandoned Pinchot over his refusal to certify Vare's election as United States Senator in 1926. Hemphill won 226,811 votes on the Liberal Party line in Philadelphia, nearly twice the vote he received on the Democratic ticket.

After Pinchot's election, Vare was ousted as party boss.

Background

1926 United States Senate election

In 1926, Gifford Pinchot (then Governor of Pennsylvania) and William Scott Vare (U.S. Representative and boss of the powerful Philadelphia political machine) both challenged incumbent United States Senator George W. Pepper in the Republican primary. Pepper carried nearly every county in the state, but Vare won the race narrowly, thanks to a 224,000 vote margin in Philadelphia County. Vare went on to win the general election by a wider margin, again relying on a large margin from Philadelphia.

Pinchot, acting in his role as governor, declined to certify the results of Vare's election. After a year-long review of the contested election, the Senate voted 58–22 not to seat Vare on the grounds that he had fraudulently and extravagantly financed his campaign against Pepper. During the lengthy investigation, Vare suffered a stroke brought on by stress.

Results

|-
|-bgcolor="#EEEEEE"
| colspan="3" align="right" | Totals
| align="right" | 2,105,381
| align="right" | 100.00%
|}

References

1930
Pennsylvania
Gubernatorial
November 1930 events